These were the rosters of the 10 teams competing at the 2009 FIBA Americas Championship.

Group A

Canada

|}
| valign="top" |
 Head coach

Legend
nat field describes country of last club  before the tournament
Age field is age on August 26, 2009

Average Age 24.8
|}

Mexico

|}
| valign="top" |
 Head coach

Legend
nat field describes country of last club  before the tournament
Age field is age on August 26, 2009
|}

Puerto Rico

|}
| valign="top" |
 Head coach

Legend
nat field describes country of last club  before the tournament
Age field is age on August 26, 2009
|}

Uruguay

|}
| valign="top" |
 Head coach

Legend
nat field describes country of last club  before the tournament
Age field is age on August 26, 2009
|}

Virgin Islands

|}
| valign="top" |
 Head coach

Legend
nat field describes country of last club  before the tournament
Age field is age on August 26, 2009
|}

Group B

Argentina

|}
| valign="top" |
 Head coach

Legend
nat field describes country of last club  before the tournament
Age field is age on August 26, 2009
|}

Brazil

|}
| valign="top" |
 Head coach

Legend
nat field describes country of last club  before the tournament
Age field is age on August 26, 2009
|}

Dominican Republic

|}
| valign="top" |
 Head coach

Legend
nat field describes country of last club  before the tournament
Age field is age on August 26, 2009
|}

Panama

|}
| valign="top" |
 Head coach

Legend
nat field describes country of last club  before the tournament
Age field is age on August 26, 2009
|}

Venezuela

|}
| valign="top" |
 Head coach

Legend
nat field describes country of last club  before the tournament
Age field is age on August 26, 2009
|}

References
 FIBA Americas Championship Teams
 LatinBasket

2009
squads